The 2003 Nigerian Senate election in Rivers State was held on 12 April 2003, to elect members of the Nigerian Senate to represent Rivers State. Ibiapuye Martyns-Yellowe representing Rivers West, Lee Maeba representing Rivers South-East and John Azuta-Mbata representing Rivers East all won on the platform of the Peoples Democratic Party.

Overview

Summary

Results

Rivers West 
The election was won by Ibiapuye Martyns-Yellowe of the Peoples Democratic Party.

Rivers South-East 
The election was won by Lee Maeba of the Peoples Democratic Party.

Rivers East 
The election was won by John Azuta-Mbata of the Peoples Democratic Party.

References 

April 2003 events in Nigeria
Rivers State Senate elections
Riv